Nihira Joshi (born 10 December 1986) is an Indian singer. She was a Sa Re Ga Ma Pa Challenge 2005 finalist achieving 5th place with public votes. Joshi is also a member of Ismail Darbar's "Yalgar Ho" Gharana.

Education and career 

Nihira Joshi is a graduate from Mithibai College, Mumbai. Her playback singing career includes the songs "Dhadak Dhadak", with Sunidhi Chauhan and Udit Narayan in the film Bunty Aur Babli, "Sabse Alag" from the film Alag, "Raat Kahegi Daastan" from the film 88 Antop Hill "Mera Dil" and "Babuji Dheere" from the film Salaam-e-Ishq: A Tribute to Love and "Tan Man" from Marigold. She has also sung the title song of the Ekta Kapoor Zee TV serial "Kasamh Se" and the Radio City theme song with playback singer Shaan.

Nihira is the only female singer in the entire album of Salaam-e-Ishq: A Tribute to Love who sings two songs. "Mera Dil" is a sugar-coated love song sung by Nihira and Shaan. The track was composed for Ayesha Takia and Akshaye Khanna in the film. Nihira also croons the re-arranged [not remixed] version of the classic "Babuji Dheere Chalna" [Aar Paar] originally sung by Geeta Dutt.

Nihira was a former winner on the Ghazal show, Aadab Arz Hai.

Nihira's voice appeared in Hindi movies, including Bunty aur Bublly, Salame Ishq, Marigold, Kabhi Alvida Na kehena  and background vocal on Alag and 88 Antop Hill.

Nihira's voice in Marathi movies, including Pailteer, Amhi Satpute and Tula shikaveen changla dhada. A forthcoming Marathi project is films Londoncha Navra.

On TV, she sang the Kasamh Se title song and background vocals for various serials on Zee TV.

Live performance

She performed in musical stage shows in Singapore, India and the United States.

References

External links
 
Nihira Joshi in SRGMP
Nihira sings for Balaji's show

Living people
Indian women playback singers
Sa Re Ga Ma Pa participants
Singers from Mumbai
1993 births
21st-century Indian women singers
21st-century Indian singers